Canarsia is a monotypic snout moth genus described by George Duryea Hulst in 1890. Its one species, described by James Brackenridge Clemens in 1860, is Canarsia ulmiarrosorella, the elm leaftier moth. It is found in North America including Massachusetts, Alabama and Oklahoma.

The wingspan is about 17 mm. The larvae feed on Ulmus rubra.

References

Phycitini
Monotypic moth genera
Moths of North America
Taxa named by George Duryea Hulst
Pyralidae genera